Hepburn is a family name of the Anglo-Scottish border, that is associated with a variety of notable people, eponyms, places, and things. Although commonly a Scottish name, its origins lie to the south of the border in the north of England. Specifically, the name is thought to have derived from Hepburn or Hebron in Northumberland or Hebburn in Tyne and Wear. The origins of the name are suggested to be the same as that of Hebborne from the Old English words heah ("high") and byrgen ("burial mound"). Alternatively it could mean something along the lines of "high place beside the water", as the word burn is a still widely used in Northumbrian and Scots for stream.

Next to Chillingham Castle there remains a bastle tower where the family originated. This was the seat of a line of the family until the eighteenth century when that branch died out, having left only a female heir. However, it is as the Earls of Bothwell that the Hepburn family are perhaps best remembered. This branch of the family originated in Lothian when a Hepburn was granted land having saved the Earl of March from a horse that had lost control. This family first became the Lords of Hailes before being granted the Earldom of Bothwell.

There were also Hepburns of Waughton, thought by some to have branched off from the Hailes line, thought by others to predate it. Another line was the Hepburns of Beanston, and yet another was the Hepburns of Athelstaneford. All of these families were prominent in various ways at various junctures of Scottish history, but all were primarily located around the East Lothian area.

Scottish nobles
 Patrick Hepburn, 1st Lord of Hailes (died 1483)
 Adam Hepburn, Master of Hailes (died 1479), son of Patrick, 1st Lord of Hailes
 Patrick Hepburn, 1st Earl of Bothwell (died 1508), son of Adam, Master of Hailes
 Adam Hepburn of Craggis (died 1513), son of Adam, Master of Hailes
 George Hepburn (bishop) (died 1513), son of Adam, Master of Hailes
 Adam Hepburn, 2nd Earl of Bothwell (died 1513), son of Patrick, 1st Earl of Bothwell
 Patrick Hepburn, 3rd Earl of Bothwell (1512–1556), son of Adam, 2nd Earl of Bothwell
 James Hepburn, 4th Earl of Bothwell (c. 1534–1578), son of Patrick, 3rd Earl of Bothwell, and husband of Mary, Queen of Scots
 James Hepburn (bishop) (died 1524), Scottish prelate and administrator
 Francis Stewart Hepburn, 5th Earl of Bothwell (before 1563–1612), nephew of James, 4th Earl of Bothwell

Politics
 A. Barton Hepburn (1846–1922), American banker and politician
 Bernard Rickart Hepburn (1876–1939), member of the Canadian House of Commons
 James de Congalton Hepburn (fl. 1940s), Speaker of the Ontario (Canada) Legislature
 Jamie Hepburn (born 1979), member of the Scottish Parliament
 Mitchell Hepburn (1896–1953), Premier of Ontario, Canada
 Moses Hepburn (1832–1897), American politician and businessman
 Patrick Buchan-Hepburn (1901–1974), Scottish politician
 Robert Rickart Hepburn Member of Parliament for Kincardineshire 1768–1774
 Stephen Hepburn (born 1959), English Member of Parliament
 William Peters Hepburn (1833–1916), American congressman for Iowa, author of the Hepburn Act of 1906

Academia
 Alexa Hepburn, English social psychologists
 Andrew Dousa Hepburn (1830–1921), president of Miami University and Davidson College
 Charles A. Hepburn (born 1891–1971), Scottish businessman and philanthropist
 Ian Hepburn (190274), British schoolmaster, botanist, ecologist and author
 James Hepburn (1811–1869), British ornithologist
 James Bonaventure Hepburn (1573–1620), Scottish Catholic scholar
 James Curtis Hepburn (1815–1911), American linguist, devised a romanization system for Japanese

Arts and entertainment
 Katharine Hepburn (1907–2003), American actress
 Kathleen Hepburn, Canadian screenwriter and film director
 Audrey Hepburn (nee Ruston) (1929–1993), Belgian-born British actress
 Barton Hepburn (1906–1955), American actor
 Dee Hepburn (born 1961), Scottish actress
 Alex Hepburn (born 1986), British singer

Sports
 Craig Hepburn (born 1969), Bahamian long-jumper
 Doug Hepburn (1926–2000), Canadian weightlifter
 James Hepburn (born 1876), Scottish-American professional golfer
 Michael Hepburn (born 1991), Australian track and road cyclist
 Ralph Hepburn (1896–1948), American motorcycle and racecar driver
 Ross Hepburn (born 1972), Scottish curler

Military
 Allan Hepburn (1896–1975), Australian World War I flying ace
 Arthur Japy Hepburn (1877–1964), US Navy Admiral
 Sir John Hepburn (c. 1598–1636), Scottish soldier, fought for Sweden and France

Trade Unions
 Thomas Hepburn (c. 1795–1864), English miner and union founder

References

External links
 The Hepburn Family
 Clan Hepburn
 Hepburns of Donegal (county of Ireland) 

Surnames
English-language surnames
Scottish surnames
Surnames of Lowland Scottish origin
Northumbria